Thomas Run Church, also known as Watters Meeting House, is a historic Methodist church located at Bel Air, Harford County, Maryland. It is a one-story, rubble stone, three-bay church with a slate-covered gabled roof.  It was among the first structures used by Methodists in colonial America.

History

On October 16, 1751, Henry Watters was born near the present site of the church.  After being converted to the Methodist faith at the Presbury meeting in 1771, he came back to his home to start a church.  He was known as being one of the first American "itinerant" preachers.  Around the same time, a log structure was built on the site.  It was known as the "Watters Meeting House", but unfortunately the structure was destroyed by a fire years later.  The current structure, made of stone, was erected around 1840 on the very spot that the previous log building once stood.  It served the Methodist church for many years.  The church grew and later became the home of Daniel Ruff, a circuit rider of the Methodist Episcopal Church.
According to records at the Lovely Lane Methodist Museum in Baltimore, Maryland, the Church was part of the Darlington Methodist Charge, which included Darlington United Methodist Church and Rock Run United Methodist Church.  Records from the Lovely Lane Museum also show that the church celebrated its 150th anniversary in August 1932.  It was shared with the other churches in the celebrations, which lasted for a couple weeks. 
In 1931, Reverend Raymond E. Manley came to serve the charge.  In his memoirs, he writes of the interesting travel to the church every week:

"There were three churches- Darlington, Rock Run, and Thomas Run.  It was an adventure to go to Thomas Run which was miles back 
from the main road and the road leading to the church was not kept, which made it hard on a car.  This church was kept up by one family and they paid their part regularly."

In 1945, the church closed its doors.  It has remained with the Darlington Methodist charge since.  For many years, activities still occurred at the church.  In 1947, it is known that youth activities from all three churches met there for an entire weekend.  Currently, services are held semiannually with one on the first Sunday of June and the other on the first Sunday of October.  In March 1996, an arson set fire to the building resulting in complete destruction of the interior.  Luckily, photos were used to help reconstruct the inside as close as possible.  The church was re-dedicated in October 2000.

The church was purchased by Blanche and Lester Pyle in 1963 from the Methodist Conference.  It is now run by the Thomas Run Foundation, Inc.

It was listed on the National Register of Historic Places in 1978.

Gallery

References

External links

, including photo from 1969, at Maryland Historical Trust

United Methodist churches in Maryland
Churches in Harford County, Maryland
Churches completed in 1840
Churches on the National Register of Historic Places in Maryland
Buildings and structures in Bel Air, Harford County, Maryland
National Register of Historic Places in Harford County, Maryland